Arkansas Highway 187 (AR 187 and Hwy. 187) is a roughly three–quarter loop state highway in Carroll County, Arkansas. The route of  runs from Highway 23 to US Highway 62. The highway passes over the Beaver Bridge, a 1943 suspension bridge, and Beaver Dam, constructed in the 1960s to provide water and electricity for the Northwest Arkansas region.

Route description
 

The route begins at Highway 23 north of Eureka Springs and runs northwest over the Beaver Bridge to enter Beaver. The bridge is restricted to one–lane traffic with a  weight limit and is listed on the National Register of Historic Places. After Beaver, Highway 187 curves east to meet US 62. The routes form a  concurrency through Busch, after which Highway 187 turns south.

The route continues along Beaver Lake before turning east to terminate at US 62 near Eureka Springs.

History
An earlier highway, also called Arkansas Highway 187, existed in Tuckerman from AR 37 north and east back to US 67 (now AR 367) from 1945 until 1953.

The current route was designated in June 1965.

Major intersections
Mile markers reset at concurrencies. 

|-
| align=center colspan=4|  concurrency east, 
|-

References

187
Transportation in Carroll County, Arkansas